Vikneshwaran Marimuthu (born 30 August 1992) is an Indian cricketer. He made his List A debut for Puducherry in the 2018–19 Vijay Hazare Trophy on 21 September 2018. He made his first-class debut for Puducherry in the 2018–19 Ranji Trophy on 12 November 2018. He made his Twenty20 debut for Puducherry in the 2018–19 Syed Mushtaq Ali Trophy on 21 February 2019.

References

External links
 

1992 births
Living people
Indian cricketers
Pondicherry cricketers
Place of birth missing (living people)